Mayumba National Park is a national park in southwestern Gabon. It is a thin tongue of beach, dunes, savanna, and rain-forest in the extreme south of the country, between Mayumba and the Congo border. Mayumba National Park shelters 60 km of the most important leatherback turtle nesting beaches on Earth and is home to unique coastal vegetation and a variety of terrestrial animals, including forest elephants, buffaloes, leopards, gorillas, chimpanzees, antelopes, crocodiles, hippos, and several species of monkeys. It also stretches for 15 km out to sea, protecting important marine habitats for dolphins, sharks, and migrating humpback whales. It is Gabon's only primarily marine park.

External links 
Virtual Tour of the National Parks
 Official Mayumba National Park Website- English and French
 Wildlife Conservation Society

National parks of Gabon
Protected areas established in 2002
2002 establishments in Gabon
Western Congolian forest–savanna mosaic